David Crowley may refer to:

David Crowley (Ohio politician) (1937–2011), Cincinnati City Council member
David Crowley (Wisconsin politician) (born 1986), Milwaukee County county executive and former Wisconsin State Assembly member
David H. Crowley (1882–1951), Michigan Attorney General
David Crowley, filmmaker whose death was documented in A Gray State